The 2021 Asian Wrestling Championships took place from 13 April to 18 April in Almaty, Kazakhstan. It was held at the same venue as the 2021 Asian Wrestling Olympic Qualification Tournament. This event was the 34th edition of the Asian Wrestling Championships.

China did not enter the competition and Japan's women team withdrew before the championship due to close contact with a patient of COVID-19.

Medal table

Team ranking

Medal summary

Men's freestyle

Men's Greco-Roman

Women's freestyle

Participating nations 
263 competitors from 20 nations competed.

 (1)
 (4)
 (29)
 (20)
 (11)
 (20)
 (30)
 (4)
 (25)
 (21)
 (2)
 (2)
 (2)
 (2)
 (30)
 (3)
 (4)
 (11)
 (13)
 (29)

References

External links
 2021 Asian Wrestling Championships
 Results Book

Asia
Asian Wrestling Championships
Wrestling
International wrestling competitions hosted by Kazakhstan
Asian Wrestling Championships
Sports competitions in Almaty